In offshore and coastal engineering, metocean refers to the syllabic abbreviation of meteorology and (physical) oceanography.

Metocean study
In various stages of an offshore or coastal engineering project a metocean study will be undertaken. This, in order to estimate the environmental conditions of direct influence on the choices to be made during the project phase at hand, and to arrive at an effective and efficient solution for the problems/goals stated. In later phases of a project, more detailed and thorough metocean studies may be needed, depending on whether there is an expected additional gain with respect to the successful and efficient completion of the project.

Metocean conditions
Metocean conditions refer to the combined wind, wave and climate (etc.) conditions as found on a certain location. They are most often presented as statistics, including seasonal variations, scatter tables, wind roses and probability of exceedance. The metocean conditions may include, depending on the project and its location, statistics on:
Meteorology 
 wind speed, direction, gustiness, wind rose and wind spectrum
 air temperature
 humidity  
 occurrence and strength of typhoons, hurricanes and (other) cyclones 

Physical oceanography
 water level fluctuations
 historical, expected and seasonal sea level changes
 storm surges
 tides
 tsunamis
 seiches
 wind waves – wind seas and swells – characterised by statistics like: significant wave heights and periods, propagation directions and (directional) spectra
 bathymetry
 salinity, temperature and other constituents
 stratification, density-driven currents and internal waves
 ice occurrence, extent, thickness, strength and seabed gouging

Metocean data

The metocean conditions are preferably based on metocean data, which can come from measuring instruments deployed in or near the project area, global (re-analysis) models and remote sensing (often by satellites). For estimating probabilities of exceedance – for relevant physical quantities – data of extreme events during more than one year is needed.

By use of validated numerical models, the availability of metocean data can be extended. For instance, consider the case of a coastal location where no wave measurements are available. If there is long-term wave data available in a nearby offshore location (e.g. from satellites), a wind wave model can be employed to transform the offshore wave statistics to the nearshore location (provided the bathymetry is known).

Often, long-term local measurements of wave conditions due to extreme events (e.g. hurricanes) are missing. By using estimates for the wind fields during past extreme events, the corresponding wave conditions can be computed through wave hindcasts.

Notes

References

Offshore engineering
Coastal engineering
Physical oceanography
Climate and weather statistics